Mikhail Vasilyevich Semichastny (born December 5, 1910 in Perlovka, now part of Mytishchi, Russia; died August 30, 1978 in Moscow) was a Soviet professional football player and coach.

Honours
 Soviet Top League top scorer: 1936 (spring), 6 goals.
 Soviet Top League champion: 1936 (spring), 1937, 1940, 1945, 1949.
 Soviet Top League runner-up: 1936 (autumn), 1946, 1947, 1948, 1950.
 Soviet Top League bronze (as a manager): 1953.
 Soviet Cup winner: 1937.

External links
 

1910 births
People from Mytishchi
1978 deaths
Burials at Vagankovo Cemetery
Russian footballers
Soviet footballers
Soviet Top League players
PFC CSKA Moscow players
FC Dynamo Moscow players
FC Dynamo Moscow managers
Association football forwards
Soviet football managers
Sportspeople from Moscow Oblast